Sylvia Crawley (born September 27, 1972) is a former American professional women's basketball forward, licensed minister and motivational speaker. She was also the head women's basketball coach of the Boston College Eagles, from 2008 to 2012, and an assistant coach with the Indiana Fever of the WNBA. She is currently an assistant coach for the North Carolina Tar Heels women's basketball team, her alma mater, where she also held the same position from 2000 to 2002.

Playing career 
After starring at Steubenville High School, Crawley played collegiate basketball for the women's basketball team at the University of North Carolina at Chapel Hill (UNC). She was a member of the UNC's NCAA Women's Division I Basketball Championship team in 1994, her senior season.

After graduation from UNC, Crawley played for the Portland Power and Colorado Xplosion of the American Basketball League (ABL). She won the ABL's slam dunk contest in 1998 with a blindfolded dunk and a second dunk.

After the ABL folded due to financial problems, she was selected by the Portland Fire, and played with them for three seasons. When the Fire folded, Crawley was selected by the Indiana Fever during the WNBA's dispersal draft in April 2003. But prior to the start of the 2003 season, the Fever traded Crawley and a rookie player Gwen Jackson to the San Antonio Silver Stars, in exchange for Natalie Williams and Coretta Brown.

Crawley spent that one season with the Silver Stars in 2003, mostly in a reserve role, that was marred when she suffered a sprained neck injury after a collision with Washington Mystics player Tonya Washington while chasing for a loose ball.

Shortly before the 2004 WNBA season began, Crawley announced her retirement from basketball. But just prior to the start of the 2006 season, Crawley came out of retirement and signed a contract to return to the Silver Stars for the season. However, the day before the season started, the Silver Stars waived her from the training camp roster.

North Carolina statistics
Source

USA Basketball
Crawley was named to the team representing the USA at the 1995 Pan American Games, however, only four teams committed to participate, so the event was cancelled.

Crawley represented the USA at the 1995 World University Games held in Fukuoka, Japan in August and September 1995. The team had a record of 5–1, securing the silver medal. The USA team won early and reached a record of 5–0 when Crawley's 25 points helped the USA beat Yugoslavia. In the semi-final game, the USA faced Russia. The team was behind much of the first half but managed to tie the game at the half. The USA broke the game open in the second half and won 101–74. The gold medal match was against unbeaten Italy. The Italian team started strong, scoring 12 of the first 14 points of  the contest. Crawley scored eight consecutive points to end the first half, but that left the USA nine points behind. The USA took a small lead in the second half, but the team from Italy responded with a ten-point run, and won the game and the gold medal by a score of 73–65. Crawley  was the second leading scorer for the USA team with 15.1 points per game.

Crawley was named to the team representing the USA at the 1996 William Jones Cup competition in Taipei, Taiwan. The team won all nine games to win the gold medal. Crawley averaged 8.4 points per game and blocked ten shots. She was named to the All-Tournament second team.

Crawley again played with the USA team at the 1999 Pan American Games. The team finished with a record of 4–3, but managed to win the bronze medal with an 85–59 victory over Brazil. Crawley averaged 5.5 points per game.

Coaching career
Crawley served as an assistant coach at her alma mater, the University of North Carolina, from 2000–02 and returned in 2015. In her first two seasons with the Tar Heels, the team was 41–23 and made a Sweet Sixteen appearance in the 2002 NCAA Tournament. After the completion of her professional playing career in 2004, she served as the top assistant at Fordham University under head coach Jim Lewis. Following Lewis' retirement at the end of the 2005–2006 season, Crawley was named interim head coach.

Shortly thereafter, Crawley was named head coach of the Ohio Bobcats' women's basketball team on April 18, 2006. On April 28, 2008, Crawley was named the head coach of women's basketball at Boston College. Upon her hiring BC athletic director Gene DeFilippo stated "This is an exciting day for BC women's basketball. Sylvia Crawley has enjoyed phenomenal success both as a player and as a coach. As a North Carolina graduate, she knows the ACC inside and out. We are very fortunate to have her as our new coach." In her first season at the Heights, Sylvia led the Eagles to a 23–12 record and an appearance in the WNIT Final Four. In her next three seasons at BC, Crawley's teams went 17–15, 20–13 and 7–23. In her four season tenure at BC, Crawley's teams never posted a winning record against Atlantic Coast Conference opponents (overall ACC record: 20–38). On March 15, 2012, Crawley announced her resignation from the BC head coaching job, citing an unspecified medical issue.

After the departure of Mickie DeMoss, the Indiana Fever and head coach Lin Dunn named Crawley as an assistant coach with the team.

Crawley served as an assistant coach with her alma mater, the University of North Carolina from 2016 until 2019, when Sylvia Hatchell reitred.

Head coaching record

References

External links 
Sylvia Crawley page on Ohiobobcats.com
Ohio Bobcats Women's Basketball
WNBA player profile and statistics
 April 18, 2006 press release on Crawley being named head coach at Ohio University
 April 29, 2008 press release on Sylvia Crawley being named head women's basketball coach at Boston College
March 15, 2012 Women's Basketball Coach Sylvia Crawley resigns on bceagles.com
 Boston College: Sylvia Crawley Returns to WNBA

1972 births
Living people
American women's basketball coaches
American women's basketball players
Basketball coaches from Ohio
Basketball players at the 1999 Pan American Games
Basketball players from Ohio
Boston College Eagles women's basketball coaches
Colorado Xplosion players
Fordham Rams women's basketball coaches
Indiana Fever coaches
North Carolina Tar Heels women's basketball coaches
North Carolina Tar Heels women's basketball players
Ohio Bobcats women's basketball coaches
Sportspeople from Steubenville, Ohio
Pan American Games bronze medalists for the United States
Pan American Games medalists in basketball
Portland Fire players
Portland Power players
Power forwards (basketball)
San Antonio Stars players
Universiade gold medalists for the United States
Universiade medalists in basketball
Medalists at the 1999 Pan American Games
United States women's national basketball team players